Webull Corporation is a holding company incorporated in the Cayman Islands and headquartered in New York. Its subsidiaries operate an electronic trading platform, accessible via mobile app and desktop computer, offering commission-free and low-cost trading of stocks, exchange traded funds, options, margins, and cryptocurrencies. Its U.S.-based subsidiary, Webull Financial LLC, is a security broker registered with the U.S. Securities and Exchange Commission and a member of FINRA and SIPC, offering trading services to customers in the U.S. It also has licensed subsidiaries offering trading services in Hong Kong and Singapore. Webull Corporation has received backing from private equity investors in the U.S., Europe and China.

History
On May 24, 2017, Webull Financial LLC was established as a Delaware limited liability company by Wang Anquan, a former employee of Alibaba Group. A year later, in May 2018, the company released its mobile app for iOS and Android. In May 2020, the company received SEC approval to launch a robo-advisor on its platform. 

By August 2020, the platform had over 11 million registered users, and in October 2020, it had 750,000 daily active users.

In November 2020, Webull began supporting cryptocurrency transactions.

On January 28, 2021, Webull halted buy orders for stocks affected by the GameStop short squeeze, but reversed course and allowed buy orders starting at 2:35 pm that day. On that day, Webull recorded its highest-ever number of active daily users at 952,000. That week, approximately 1.2 million people downloaded the Webull mobile app.

In June 2021, Webull began talks of an initial public offering to raise up to $400 million.

In September 2021, the Brooklyn Nets and New York Liberty entered into a global multi-year agreement with Webull and the company became the official jersey patch partner for the Nets. Terms of the agreement for the jersey patch weren't announced, but people familiar with the agreement told CNBC that it is a multi-year pact that pays the Nets roughly $30 million per year.

References

Financial services companies established in 2017
Online financial services companies of the United States
Online brokerages
Companies based in Manhattan
Mobile applications
Xiaomi